Archbold is a village in Fulton County, Ohio, United States. The population was 4,346 at the 2010 census.

Archbold is home to Northwest State Community College. It was designated a Tree City USA by the National Arbor Day Foundation in 1983.

History

Archbold was founded in 1855 when the railroad was extended to that point. The village was probably named for John Archbald, a railroad promoter, though another tradition is that the name is an amalgamation of Arch and Bald, two other railroad officials. A post office called Archbold has been in operation since 1855.

Geography
Archbold is located at  (41.518290, -84.305483).

Demographics

2010 census
As of the census of 2010, there were 4,346 people, 1,760 households, and 1,178 families living in the village. The racial makeup of the village was 90.5% White, 0.5% African American, 0.5% Native American, 0.9% Asian, 5.6% from other races, and 2.0% from two or more races. Hispanic or Latino of any race were 16.8% of the population.

There were 1,760 households, of which 31.1% had children under the age of 18 living with them, 54.7% were married couples living together, 9.4% had a female householder with no husband present, 2.8% had a male householder with no wife present, and 33.1% were non-families. 29.1% of all households were made up of individuals, and 13.6% had someone living alone who was 65 years of age or older. The average household size was 2.41 and the average family size was 2.99.

The median age in the village was 41 years. 25.7% of residents were under the age of 18; 5.8% were between the ages of 18 and 24; 23.5% were from 25 to 44; 25.1% were from 45 to 64; and 19.9% were 65 years of age or older. The gender makeup of the village was 46.9% male and 53.1% female.

2000 census
As of the census of 2000, there were 4,290 people, 1,717 households, and 1,167 families living in the village. The population density was 1,009.2 people per square mile (389.7/km). There were 1,807 housing units at an average density of 425.1 per square mile (164.2/km). The racial makeup of the village was 91.54% White, 0.47% African American, 0.33% Native American, 0.51% Asian, 5.78% from other races, and 1.38% from two or more races. Hispanic or Latino of any race were 12.42% of the population.

There were 1,717 households, out of which 33.0% had children under the age of 18 living with them, 58.0% were married couples living together, 7.3% had a female householder with no husband present, and 32.0% were non-families. 29.8% of all households were made up of individuals, and 15.1% had someone living alone who was 65 years of age or older. The average household size was 2.44, and the average family size was 3.05.

In the village, the population was spread out, with 26.4% under the age of 18, 7.1% from 18 to 24, 26.3% from 25 to 44, 20.1% from 45 to 64, and 20.0% who were 65 years of age or older. The median age was 38 years. For every 100 females there were 89.7 males. For every 100 females age 18 and over, there were 83.9 males.

The median income for a household in the village was $43,155, and the median income for a family was $52,050. Males had a median income of $37,243 versus $25,990 for females. The per capita income for the village was $21,971. About 1.8% of families and 4.4% of the population were below the poverty line, including 4.8% of those under age 18 and 3.1% of those age 65 or over.

Education
Archbold is home to Archbold Area Schools, the only school district in the village of Archbold. Four County Career Center is also in Archbold, which is a career based technical school for students currently in their junior or senior year. Northwest State Community College is also in Archbold, a local community college.

The village has a public lending library.

Notable people
 Sam Hornish Jr., NASCAR driver
 Erie J. Sauder, inventor of the "knock-down" ready-to-assemble furniture.
 Henry Winzeler, Founder of the Ohio Art Company.

References

Villages in Fulton County, Ohio
Villages in Ohio